Spectrum Community School is a high school in the Greater Victoria suburb of Saanich, British Columbia, Canada. It is part of the Greater Victoria School District and serves the western portion of the district. Spectrum was established in 1974 as a replacement for Mount View High School and the school moved into the new facility in 1976. In 2005 a $5.5 million addition and renovation was completed. There are four computer labs and an active interactive whiteboard resources program. The school has an Aboriginal Nations Education program and accepts international students from the Victoria International High School program. The school's auditorium is a venue for the Greater Victoria Performing Arts festival. In 2006 students voted to select a team name and the nickname "Thunder" was chosen.

Programs

Academic
 Health Science 
 Secondary School Apprenticeship
 Infotech
 AVID (Advancement Via Individual Determination) 
 Honours classes 

Career
 Culinary Arts/Cook Training
 Electrical
 Law Careers 
 Outdoor Leadership 

Performing Arts
 Junior Concert, Jazz, and Marching Band, 
 Senior Concert, Jazz and Marching Band
 Junior Musical Theatre
 Mainstage Musical Theatre Production
 Pit Orchestra
 Dance Performance, Choreography, and Advanced Dance
 Stagecraft & Technical Theatre
 Video Arts & Media Arts

Athletics
There are 19 athletic teams, including:
 Hockey Skills Academy
 Football

Notable alumni 
Dan Bennett, rapper
Shawn Farquhar, magician
Eddie Murray, retired NFL kicker
Brant Pinvidic, Canadian-American reality television producer and director

References

External links
Spectrum Community School website
School District 61 Greater Victoria website
School District's school webpage
Spectrum Band webpage
Spectrum Alumni webpage

High schools in British Columbia
Saanich, British Columbia
Educational institutions established in 1974
1974 establishments in British Columbia